In optics the noise-equivalent flux density (NEFD) or noise-equivalent irradiance (NEI) of a system is the level of flux density required to be equivalent to the noise present in the system. It is a measure used by astronomers in determining the accuracy of observations.

The NEFD can be related to a light detector's noise-equivalent power for a collection area A and a photon bandwidth  by:

, 

where a factor  (often 2, in the case of switching between measuring a source and measuring off-source) accounts for the photon statistics for the mode of operation.

References

Physical quantities
Vector calculus